This list of prehistoric ostracods is an attempt to create a comprehensive listing of all genera from the fossil record that have ever been considered to be members of the Ostracoda, excluding purely vernacular terms. The list includes all commonly accepted genera, but also genera that are now considered invalid, doubtful (nomina dubia), or were not formally published (nomina nuda), as well as junior synonyms of more established names, and genera that are no longer considered ostracods.

List

Aaleniella
Abditoloculina
Abrobairdia
Abrocythereis
Absonocytheropteron
Abursus
Abyssobairdia
Abyssocypris
Abyssocythere
Abyssocythereis
Acanthobolbina
Acanthocythere
Acanthocythereis
Acanthomeridion
Acanthoscapha
Acantonodella
Acratia
Acratina
Acratinella
Acravincula
Acrocythere
Acronotella
Acrossula
Actiangulata
Actinochilina
Actinocythereis
Acuprisma
Acuticythereis
Acuticytheretta
Acvocaria
Adamczakia
Adamczakites
Adeditia
Adelphobolbina
Admirabilinella
Aechmina
Aechminaria
Aechminella
Aegyptiana
Aetholicotoxotis
Afranticythereis
Afrocytheridea
Agrenocythere
Agulhasina
Ahlintella
Aikenicythere
Airina
Aitilia
Ajchalina
Akkermites
Alakolites
Alaskabolbina
Alatacavellina
Alatacythere
Alataleberis
Albrunnicola
Algerina
Allocythereis
Alocopocythere
Aloculatia
Altaecypris
Altha Neckaja, 1958 (non Walker, 1862: preoccupied) – see Neckajatia
Aluta
Alutella
Alveolella
Ambocythere
Ambostracon
Amerigobolbina
Amicus
Amphicostella
Amphicythere
Amphicytherura
Amphikegelites
Amphileberis
Amphisella
Amphissites
Amphistegina
Amphitoxotis
Amphizona
Ampletochilina
Ampuloides
Amygdalella
Anabarochilina
Anahuacia Grundel, 1972 (non Hoffmann, 1963: preoccupied)
Anchistrocheles
Anebocythereis
Aneisohealdia
Anfedatia
Angliaecytheridea
Anisochilina
Anisocyamus
Ankumia
Anommatocyther
Anomocytheridea
Antiaechmia
Antibythocypris
Anticostiella
Anticythereis
Antischmidtella
Antohipponicharion
Aparchitella
Aparchitellina
Aparchites
Aparchitocythere
Apateloschizocythere
Apatobolbina
Apatochilina
Apatocythere
Aphelocythere
Aphrikanecythere
Aratrocypris
Arcacythere
Archeocosta
Archeocuneocythere
Archicythereis
Arcuaria
Arcyzona
Ardennea
Argenticytheretta
Argilloecia
Arikloedenia
Aristaluta
Aristozoe
Arqoviella
Arrazocypris
Arsiriina
Artifactella
Aruduce
Ascetoleberis
Asciocythere
Asturiella
Asymmetricythere
Atjehella
Atlanticythere
Atterdagia
Aulacopsis
Aulocytheridea
Auriculatella
Aurigerites
Aurikirkbya
Aurila
Australicythere
Australobollia
Australoecia
Australopsis
Aversovalva
Aviacypris
Baffincythere
Bairdia
Bairdianella
Bairdiocypris
Bairdiohealdites
Bairdiolites
Bairdites
Bairdoppilata
Bajacythere
Bajiella
Bakunella
Balantoides
Ballardina
Balowella
Balticella
Baltonotella
Barrosina
Barrychilina
Barychilina
Barymepton
Baschkirina
Bassleratia
Basslerella
Basslerites
Batavocythere
Bathycythere
Bathypterocythereis
Beatamoosina
Beckerhealdia
Beecherella
Beecheroscapha
Bekena
Bellornatia
Bennviaspis
Bensonia
Bensonocythere
Berdanopis
Berolinella
Berounella
Bertillonella
Beyrichia
Beyrichiana
Beyrichiella
Beyrichiopsis
Beyrichona
Biaurina
Bichilina
Bicornella
Bicornellina
Bicornucythere
Bideirella
Bilobatia
Bingeria
Binodella
Binodina
Birdsallella
Bisacculus
Bisphenella
Bispinitia
Bisulcocypris
Bisulcoentomozoe
Bivia
Bodenia
Bodeniella
Bohemobolbina
Bohlenatia
Bolbibollia
Bolbilithis
Bolbina
Bolbineossia
Bolbiprimitia
Bolbopisthia
Bolbozoe
Bolbozoella
Boldella
Bollia
Bolliaphores
Bonnemaia
Bonneprimites
Borcobolbina
Borgerscottia
Borodiella
Borovitchella
Bosquetia
Bosquetina
Botulobolbina
Boucekites
Boucia
Brachycythere
Brachycytheropteron
Braderupia
Bradleya
Bradoria
Brephocharieis
Brevibolbina
Brevidorsa
Brevisulcina
Briartina
Bromidella
Bronsteiniana
Bubnoffiopsis
Bucerella
Bucerobolbina
Budnianella
Buekkella
Bufanchiste
Bufina
Bulbosclerites
Bulbosulculus
Bullaeferum
Bullaluta
Bullatella
Buntonia
Buregia
Byrsolopsina
Bythoceratina
Bythocypris
Bythocyproidea
Bythocythere
Bythocytheromorpha
Calcaribeyrichia
Callicythere
Callistocythere
Calocaria
Cambraechmina
Cambria
Camdenidea
Camptocythere
Campylocythere
Caprabolbina
Capsacythere
Carboprimita
Cardiniferella
Cardobairdia
Caribbella
Carinaknightina
Carinobairdia
Carinobolbina
Carinocythereis
Carinokloedenia
Carnarvonia
Carubaknightina
Casterocythere
Catacoraites
Cativella
Caudites
Cavellina
Cavhithis
Cavopleura
Cavussurella
Caytonidea
Cedocamia
Celechovites
Centrocythere
Ceratobairdia
Ceratobolbina
Ceratocratia
Ceratocypris
Ceratoleperditia
Ceratopsis
Cerninella
Cershiites
Chamishaella
Changshabaella
Changyangnia
Chapmanicythereis
Chapmanites
Charitoxotis
Checontonomus
Chejudocythere
Cherskiella
Chesterella
Chevroleperditia
Chilobolbina
Chironiptrum
Chrysocythere
Cincinnaticoncha
Circulina
Cistacythereis
Citrella
Cladarocythere
Clavofabella
Clavofabellina
Cleithranchiste
Cletocythereis
Climacoidea
Clinocythere
Clintiella
Clithrocytheridea
Cluthia
Cnestocythere
Coelochilina
Coeloenellina
Coelonella
Colacchilina
Collibolbina
Collisboris
Combinivalvula
Comptaluta
Conbathella
Concavhithis
Conchoecia
Conchoprimitella
Conchoprimites
Conchoprimitia
Condomyra
Condracypris
Coniferina
Consonopsis
Conspicillum
Cooperatia
Cooperuna
Copelandella
Copelandia
Copytus
Coquimba
Cornicythereis
Cornigella
Cornikloedenia
Cornucoquimba
Cornutobairdia
Coronakirkbya
Coryellina
Coryellites
Costa
Costaegera
Costatia
Costaveenia
Costokloedenia
Covracythere
Craspedobolbina
Craspedographylus
Craspedopyxion
Crasquinia Kammerer, 2006
Crassacythere
Craterellina
Crenabolina
Crenaleya
Crescenticythere
Crescentilla
Cretaceratina
Cribroconcha
Cristaeleberis
Crucicornina
Cryptobairdia
Cryptoglytopleura
Cryptophyllus
Ctenobolbina
Ctenobolbinella
Ctenoloculina
Ctenonotella
Cubitosulcus
Cubtosulcus
Cuneoceratina
Cuneocythere
Curfsina
Cushmanidea
Cyamocytheridea
Cyathus
Cyclolberis
Cymabolbina
Cyprella
Cyprideis
Cypridella
Cypridellina
Cypridina
Cypridinella
Cypridopsis
Cyprosina
Cyprosis
Cyrtocyprus
Cystacythereis
Cystomatochilina
Cytheralison
Cythere
Cythereis
Cytherella
Cytherellina
Cytherelloidea
Cytheretta
Cytheridea
Cytheridella
Cytherissinella
Cytherois
Cytheroma
Cytheromorpha
Cytheropterina
Cytheropteron
Cytherura
Dabashanella
Dahaiella
Dahomeya
Daleiella
Dalelina
Dallonella
Damaoella
Damiriella
Damonella
Dawania
Decorella
Deefgella
Deloia
Delosia
Dentokrithe
Dentoparaparchites
Dettermania
Dibolbina
Dibolbopisthia
Diceratobolbina
Dicerobairdia
Dicranella
Dicrorygma
Dictocythere
Dictyotoxotis
Diebelina
Dielymella
Digmocythere
Dihogmochilina
Dilobella
Diogmopteron
Diplopsis
Discoidella
Disculcina
Disopontocypris
Disparigonya
Distobolbina
Disulcinoides
Diura
Dizygopleura
Dogoriella
Dolborella
Dolichoscapha
Dolichoscaphoides
Dolocythere
Dolocytheridea
Domaszevicella
Dominina
Donellina
Donmacythere
Doraclatum
Doratocythere
Dordoniella
Dorispina
Dornbuschia
Drepanella
Drepanellina
Duibianella
Dulkumella
Dumontina
Duplexibollia
Duplicristatia
Duringia
Dutoitella
Easchmidtella
Echinocythereis
Echinoprimitia
Ectoprimitia
Ectoprimitioides
Edenopsis
Editia
Effeminatopleura
Egenacythere
Egorovella
Egorovia
Egorovitina
Egorvellina
Ehlersia
Eisobairdia
Ektyphocythere
Elenamarginia
Ellesmerina
Ellipsella
Elliptocyprites
Elofsonella
Elofsonia
Elpezoe
Elpinella
Embryotoxotis
Emphasia
Endolophia Kesling, 1954 (non Hampson, 1899: preoccupied)
Entomoconchus
Entomoprimitia
Entomozoe
Entoprimitia
Eoaquapulex
Eobromidella
Eobuntonia
Eochilina
Eoconchoecia
Eocypridina
Eocytherella
Eocytheridea
Eocytheropteron
Eographiodactylus
Eohollina
Eokloedenia
Eoleperditia
Eolomatella
Eomoelleritia
Eopaijenborchella
Eoparaparchites
Eorotundracythere
Eostephanella
Epactridion
Equicastanea
Eremos
Eridoconcha
Eriella
Eripleura
Ertangia
Escharacytheridea
Estonaceratella
Estoniops
Eucraterellina
Eucythere
Eucytherura
Eudecacythere
Euglyphella
Eukloedenella
Euprimites
Euprimitia
Eurekabolbina
Eurocyamus
Europisthia
Eurychilina
Euryitycythere
Eustephanella
Euthlipsurella
Evlanella
Evlanovia
Exophthalmocythere
Extrania
Fabalicypris
Fabanella
Falites
Fallaticella
Falsipollex
Falsocythere
Falunia
Famenella
Fastigastocythere
Faveolebris
Favulella
Fellerites
Femerensia
Fengtaiella
Fidelitella
Finmarchinella
Fiorella
Fissocrinocythere
Fissocythere
Flabellimutilis
Flaccivelum
Flemingia
Flemingopsis
Flexuocythere
Flexus
Foramenella
Forbescythere
Fossirichterina
Foveaprimitella
Foveoleberis
Frambocythere
Franklinella
Frostiella
Fueloepicythere
Fuhrbergiella
Fuscinites
Fuscinullina
Galeopsis
Galliaecytheridea
Gammacythere
Gannibeyrichia
Garniella
Garnuella
Gebeckeria
Geffenina
Geffenites
Geisina
Gelidicella
Gellensia
Gemmanella
Gerbeckites
Gerubiella
Gesoriacula
Giandites
Gibba
Gibberella
Gibberlebeis
Gillatia
Ginella
Ginginella
Gipsella
Glabellacythere
Gladioscutum
Glenocythere
Glezeria
Glimmatobolbina
Glorianella
Glossomorphites
Glymmatobolbina
Glyptocythere
Glyptogatocythere
Glyptolichvinella
Glyptopleura
Glyptopleurella
Glyptopleurina
Glyptopleuroides
Golcocythere
Golcondella
Gongylostonyx
Gotlandella
Gotula
Gracquina
Gramannella
Gramannicythere
Gramella
Grammolomatella
Graphiadactyllis
Gravia
Grekoffiana
Grinioneis
Gruendelella
Gruendelicythere
Grundelella
Gryphiswaldensia
Guangdongella
Guangyuanella
Guberites
Gubkiniella
Guerichiella
Gujaratella
Gunneropsis
Gyrgathella
Gyrocythere
Habrocythere
Hallatia
Halliella
Hameaschmidtella
Hammatocythere
Hanaiborchella
Hanaiceratina
Hanaicythere
Hanaites
Hanchiangella
Haplobolbina
Haplocytheridea
Haploprimitia
Harginisulcus
Harpabollia
Harperopsis
Hastacypris
Hastatellina
Hatangeus
Haughtonileberis
Haworthina
Hazelina
Healdia
Healdiacypris
Healdianella
Healdioides
Hebellum
Hechticythere
Heinia
Heliocythere
Hellebardia
Hemeaschnidtella
Hemiaechminoides
Hemicyprideis
Hemicythere
Hemicytheria
Hemicytheridea
Hemicytherura
Hemikrithe
Hemingwayella
Hemiparacytheridea
Hemsiella
Henningsmoenia
Henryhowella
Heptaloculites
Hercynobolbina
Hercynocythere
Hermanites
Herrigocyther
Herrmannina
Hesperidella
Hesslandella
Hesslandites
Hesslandona
Heterma
Heterochilina
Heterocyprideis
Heterocythereis
Hiatobairdia
Hibbardia
Hillmeria
Hiltermannicythere
Hintziella
Hipponicharion
Hippula
Hirschmannia
Hirsutocythere
Histina
Hithis
Hogmochilina
Holcopocythere
Hollina
Hollinella
Holtedahlites
Homeoceratopsis
Homeokiesowia
Hornibrookella
Horrificiella
Houlongdongella
Hourqia
Howeina
Huanghuaella
Huantraiconella
Huckea
Hulingsina
Hungarella
Hungarogeisina
Huntonella
Hupehella
Hutsonia
Huttoniella
Hyphasmaphora
Hypotetragona
Hyrsinobolbina
Hystricocythere
Iatella
Idiocythere
Illativella
Ilmenoindivisia
Imangdites
Imhotepia
Incisurella
Incongruellina
Indiana
Indivisia
Indota
Iniella
Inisylthere
Ionicythere
Iraqicythereis
Ishmiella
Isobuntonia
Isobythocypris
Isochilina
Isocythereis
Isohabrocythere
Ispharaella
Italogeisina
Ivaria
Ivia
Jaanussonia
Jagatiella
Jakutobolbina
Jamischjewskya
Janusella
Jatella
Javanella
Javatius
Jeanlouisella
Jefina
Jenningsina
Jingguella
Jixinglingella
Jonesella
Jonesia
Jonesina
Jonesites
Jordanites
Judahella
Jugosocythereis
Junctusina
Juvenix
Kaesleria
Kalugia
Kalyptovalva
Kamajcythereis
Kangarina
Karinadomella
Karinutatia
Karlsteinella
Karsteneis
Kasovobolbina
Kassinina
Katatona
Kayatia
Kayina
Kefiella
Kegelites
Keijella
Keijicythere
Kellettina
Kemeroviana
Keslingiella
Kiaeritia
Kielciella
Kiesowia
Kikliocythere
Kindlella
Kingmaina
Kinkelinella
Kinnekullea
Kirkbya
Kirkbyella
Kirkbyellina
Kirtonella
Kitabella
Klieana
Klimphores
Klinglerella
Kloedcytherella
Kloedenella
Kloedenellitina
Kloedenia
Klonkina
Knightina
Knoxiella
Knoxina
Knoxites
Kobayashiina
Kolednikella
Kolmodinia
Komaroiella
Konicekion
Koscoviellina
Kozlowskiella
Kraftia
Krausella
Krausellina
Krithe
Kroemmelbeinella
Kroemmelbeinia
Kummerowia
Kunmingella
Kunyangella
Kuresaaria
Kuzminaella
Kyamodes
Kyphomopisthia
Labrosavelum
Laccochilina
Laccoprimitia
Lamellacratia
Langdaia
Langtonia
Lankacythere
Lapazites
Lardeuxella
Latebina
Laterophores
Ledahia
Legitimocythere
Leguminocythereis
Leiocyamus
Leioprimitia
Lembitites
Lembitsarvella
Lenatella
Leniocythere
Lennukella
Leperditella
Leperditelloides
Leperditia
Leptobolbina
Leptocythere
Leptoprimitia
Leshanella
Lesleya
Leviella
Levisulculus
Liagnshanella
Liasina
Liasopteron
Libumella
Lichvinia
Ligerina
Limatia
Limbinaria
Limbinariella
Limburgina
Lindisfarnia
Lingulibolina
Linsayella
Liujingnia
Lixouria
Ljubimovella
Loculibairdia
Loculibolbina
Loculicytheretta
Loculocavata
Lokius
Lomatobolbina
Lomatopisthia
Londinia
Longidorsa
Longiscula
Longyuanella
Looneyella
Lophoctenella
Lophocythere
Lophodentina
Lophokloedenia
Loutriella
Louza
Loxoconcha
Loxoconchella
Loxocorniculum
Loxocythere
Lublinella
Lubrzankiella
Luciter
Ludvigsenites
Luniprisma
Lutkevichinella
Luvula
Lycopterocypris
Lysogorella
Macrocyprina
Macrocypris
Macrocyproides
Macrodentina
Macronotella
Macrosarisa
Macrypsilon
Maghrebeis
Maizassionis
Majiashanella
Majungaella
Malguzaria
Malnina
Malongella
Malzella
Mammoides
Mandawacythere
Mandelstamia
Mandocythere
Mannosocmia
Mantelliana
Maratia
Marginia
Marginisulcus
Marginohealdia
Marginotimorites
Margniohealdia
Margobairdia
Margoplanitia
Marquezina
Marslatourella
Martinicythere
Martinssonopsis
Martinssonozona
Masloviella
Mastigobolbina
Maternella
Matronella
Mauritsina
Mauryella
Mayburya
Medianella
Mediocytherideis
Megommatocythere
Mehesella
Meishucunella
Melanchlenia
Memoria
Mennerella
Menoeidina
Merocythere
Mesomphalus
Messinella
Metacypris
Metacytheropteron
Microaechmina
Microcheilinella
Microchilina
Microcosmia
Microcythere
Microcytherura
Microparaparchites
Micropneumatocythere
Microxestolebris
Miehlkella
Milanovskya
Milleratia
Miltonella
Miocytheridea
Mirabairdia
Miraculum
Miracythere
Mochella
Moeckowia
Moelleritia
Moierina
Mojczella
Monasterium
Monoceratella
Monoceratina
Mononotella
Monotiopleura
Monsmirabilia
Moorea
Moorites
Moosina
Morkhovenia
Morkhovenicythereis
Mosaeleberis
Mostlerella
Movchovitschia
Muellerina
Munseyella
Murrayina
Murthya
Murtiella
Mutilus
Myomphalis
Naevhithis
Nagyella
Namaia
Nanacythere
Nanchengella
Nanopsis
Nanurocythereis
Navarracythere
Navicularina
Naviculina
Neckajatia Schallreuter, 1974
Neckajella
Necrateria
Nehdentomis
Nemoceratina
Nemuniella
Neoamphissites
Neoaparchites
Neobairdia
Neoberounella
Neobeyrichia
Neocaudites
Neochilina
Neocraterellina
Neocyprideis
Neocythere
Neocytheretta
Neocytherideis
Neodrepanella
Neokloedenella
Neokunmingella
Neomonoceratina
Neonesidea
Neonyhamnella
Neooctonaria
Neophrecythere
Neoprimitiella
Neoschmidtella
Neothlipsura
Neotsitrella
Neoulrichia
Neoveenia
Nephokirkos
Netrocytheridea
Netschajewiana
Netzkaina
Nevadabolbina
Newsomites
Nezamyslia
Nicolina
Nigeria
Nigeroloxoconcha
Nikitinella
Nionella
Nobilitella
Nodambichilina
Nodella
Nodibeyrichia
Nodobairdia
Nodophthalmocythere
Nonsukozona
Nonurocythereis
Nophrecythere
Normanicythere
Norochilina
Notocythere
Notoscapha
Novakina
Noviportia
Novobolbina
Novocypris
Novogladites
Nucleolina
Nudista
Nuguschia
Nyhamnella
Obisafitella
Obliquisylthis
Oblitacythereis
Obotrita
Occlusacythereis
Occulocytheropteron
Occultocythereis
Ochesaarina
Ochesaarina
Ochescapha
Ockerella
Octobolbina
Octonaria
Octonariellina
Octosylthere
Oecematobolbina
Oejlemyra
Oepikaluta
Oepikella
Oepikium
Oertliella
Ogmoconcha
Ogmoconchella
Ogmoopsis
Ojlemyra
Olbia
Oliganisus
Oligocythereis
Olimfalunia
Ommatokrithe
Oncotechmonus
Ophiosema
Opikatia
Opimocythere
Opisthoplax
Orbitolina
Orcofabella
Ordoniya
Ordovicia
Ordovizona
Orechina
Orientalina
Orionina
Orlovicavina
Ornatoleberis
Orthobairdia
Orthocypris
Orthonaria
Orthonotacythere
Osmotoxotis
Otocythere
Otraczetia
Ouachitaia
Ovaluta
Ovatoquasillites
Ovocytheridea
Ovornina
Pacambocythere
Pachycaudites
Pachydomella
Pachydomelloides
Paegnium
Paenaequina
Paenula
Paijenborchella
Paijenborchellina
Palaeocytheridea
Palaeocytheridella
Palaeophilomedes
Paleocosta
Paleocythere
Paleomonsmirabilia
Palmenella
Palmoconcha
Panderia
Papillatabairdia
Parabairdiacypris
Parabairdianella
Paraberounella
Parabolbina
Parabouchekius
Parabythocythere
Paracaudites
Paracavellina
Paracosta
Paractenoloculina
Paracyprideis
Paracyprinotus
Paracypris
Paracythere
Paracythereis
Paracytheretta
Paracytheridea
Paracytherois
Paracytheroma
Paracytheromorpha
Paracytheropteron
Paradoxostoma
Paraechmina
Paraeoleperditia
Paraeucypris
Paraexophthalmocythere
Paraglyptobairdia
Paraglyptopleura
Paragrenocythere
Parahealdia
Parahemingwayella
Parahippa
Parahollinella
Parajonesites
Parakozlowskiella
Parakrithe
Parakrithella
Parakunmingella
Paraleperditia
Paramacrocypris
Paramicrocheilinella
Paramoelleritia
Paramunseyella
Paranesidea
Paranotacythere
Paranoviportia
Paraoliganisus
Paraparchitella
Paraparchites
Paraphaseolella
Paraplatyrhomboides
Parapribylites
Paraprimitia
Parapyxion
Parariscus
Paraschizocythere
Paraschmidtella
Paraschuleridea
Parashergoldopsis
Parashivaella
Parasleia
Paraspinobairdia
Parasterbergella
Parataxodonta
Paratriebelina
Paratsunyiella
Paraungerella
Parenthatia
Pariceratina
Pariconchoprimitia
Parphores
Parulrichia
Parvacythereis
Parvikirbya
Patagonacythere
Patellacythere
Pauline
Pavloviella
Pectidolon
Pectocythere
Pedicythere
Pedomphalella
Pelecocythere
Pellucistoma
Peloriops
Pelycobolbina
Pennyella
Pentagona
Pentagonochilina
Peratocytheridea
Perissocytheridea
Permopolycope
Permoyoungiella
Perprimitia
Perspicillum
Peteraurila
Petrisigmoopsis
Phacorhabdotus
Phalcocythere
Phanassymetria
Phaseolella
Phasoia
Philomedes
Philoneptunus
Phlyctenophora
Phlyctiscapha
Phlyctocythere
Phodeucythere
Phreatura
Phthanoloxoconcha
Phyrocythere
Physalidopisthia
Physcocalyptra
Physocythere
Pichottia
Pilla
Pinnatulites
Pinnoxypridea
Piretella
Piretia
Piretopsis
Pistocythereis
Placidea
Plagionephrodes
Planileberis
Planiprimites
Planoria
Plantella
Planusella
Platella
Platybolbina
Platychilella
Platycythere
Platycythereis
Platyleberis
Platylophocythere
Platyrhomboides
Plavskella
Plesidielymella
Plethobolbina
Pleurifera
Pleurocythere
Pleurodella
Pneumatocythere
Podolibolbina
Pokornyella
Polenovula
Poloniella
Polyceratella
Polycope
Polydentina
Polyphyma
Polytylites
Polyzygia
Ponderodictya
Poniklacella
Pontocyprella
Pontocypris
Pontocythere
Porkornya
Porkornyopsis
Posacythere
Poseidonamicus
Posneratina
Posnerina
Posteroprotocythere
Praebythoceratina
Praelobobairdia
Praemacrocypris
Praemunseyella
Praephacorhabdotus
Praepilatina
Praeschuleridea
Praezabythocypris
Predarwinula
Premunseyella
Pribylina
Pribylites
Primitia
Primitiella
Primitiopsella
Primitiopsis
Primitivothilipsurella
Proabyssocypris
Processobairdia
Procythereis
Procytherettina
Procytheridea
Procytherideis
Procytheropteron
Procytherura
Proeditia
Profundobythere
Progoncythere
Progonoidea
Proparaparchites
Propontocypris
Prorectella
Prosumia
Protallinnella
Proteoconcha
Protoacanthcythere
Protoargilloecia
Protobuntonia
Protocythere
Protocytheretta
Protojonesia
Pseudacantoscapha
Pseudoaparchites
Pseudoaurila
Pseudobeyrichia
Pseudobeyrichiopsis
Pseudobollia
Pseudobythocypris
Pseudobythocythere
Pseudocavellina
Pseudoceratina
Pseudocyproides
Pseudocythere
Pseudocytheretta
Pseudocytheridea
Pseudocytheromorpha
Pseudocytherura
Pseudoentomozoe
Pseudohealdia
Pseudohippula
Pseudohustonia
Pseudokiesowia
Pseudokrithe
Pseudokunmingella
Pseudoleperditia
Pseudomacrocypris
Pseudomonoceratina
Pseudomyomphalus
Pseudonodella
Pseudonodellina
Pseudoparaparchites
Pseudoperissocytheridea
Pseudophanasymmetria
Pseudoprimitiella
Pseudoprotocythere
Pseudopsammocythere
Pseudorakverella
Pseudorayella
Pseudostrepula
Pseudotallinnella
Pseudozygobolbina
Pseudulrichia
Psilokirkbyella
Pteroleperditia
Pterygocythere
Pterygocythereis
Ptychobairdia
Pullvillites
Pulviella
Pulvillites
Punctaparchites
Punctomosea
Punctoschmidtella
Puriana
Puricytheretta
Pustulobairdia
Pygoconcha
Pyrocytheridea
Pyxion
Pyxiprimitia
Qingjiania
Quadracythere
Quadricollina
Quadridigitalis
Quadrijugator
Quadrilobella
Quadritia
Quasibuntonia
Quasiglyptopleura
Quasillites
Rabienella
Rabienites
Racvetina
Radimella
Raimbautina
Rakverella
Ranapeltis
Ranicella
Raymondatia
Raymoorea
Rayneria
Rectalloides
Rectella
Rectobairdia
Rectobuntonia
Rectocypris
Rectocythere
Rectonaria
Rectoplacera
Rectospinella
Rectotrachyleberis
Refrathella
Reginacypris
Reginea
Regubea
Rehacythereis
Reigiopsis
Renibeyrichia
Renngartenella
Reticestus
Reticulina
Reticulocambria
Reticulochilina
Reticulocosta
Retisacculus
Reubenella
Reuentalina
Reussicythere
Reversocypris
Reversoparaparchites
Revisylthere
Reviya
Reymenticosta
Rhadinocythere
Rhocobairdia
Rhombina
Rhombocythere
Rhomboentomozoe
Rhysomagis
Rhytiobeyrichia
Richina
Richteria
Richterina
Rigidella
Rimabollia
Rimacytheropteron
Rishona
Ritatia
Rivillina
Robertsonites
Robsoniella
Ropolonellus
Rostrocytheridea
Rothella
Rothellina
Rotundracythere
Roundyella
Rozdestvenskayites
Rozmaniella
Rubracea
Ruchholzella
Rudderina
Ruggieria
Ruggieriella
Ruptivelum
Rushdisaidina
Russia
Rutlandella
Ruttenella
Saalfeldella
Saccarchites
Saccelatia
Saffordellina
Sagittovum
Sagmatocythere
Sahnia
Sahnicythere
Saida
Samarella
Samoilovaella
Sanniolus
Sansabella
Sanyuania
Sargentina
Sarlatina
Sarmatotoxotis
Sarsicytheridea
Sarvina
Sarytumia
Satiellina
Saumella
Savagellites
Saxellacythere
Scabriculocypris
Scaldianella
Scalptina
Scanipisthia
Scaphella Zenkova, 1977 (non Swainson, 1832: preoccupied)
Scaphina
Scaphium Jordan, 1964 (non Kirby, 1837: preoccupied)
Scepticocythereis 
Schallreuteria
Schallreuterina
Schizocythere
Schleesha
Schmidtella
Schneideria
Schrenckia
Schuleridea
Schweyerina
Scipionis
Sclerochilus
Scofieldia
Scrobicula
Scrobisylthis
Segmina
Sekobolla
Selebratina
Sellula
Selon
Semibolbina
Semicytheretta
Semicytheridea
Semicytherura
Semihealdioides
Semikiesowia
Semilukiella
Seminolites
Semipetasus
Septadella
Septiferina
Serenida
Severella
Severobolbina
Severopsis
Seviculina
Shemonaella
Shensiella
Shergoldopsis
Shidelerites
Shidelerites
Shishaella
Shivaella
Shleesha
Sibiriobolbina
Sibiritella
Sibiritia
Sichuania
Sigillium
Sigmobolbina
Sigmoopsis
Sigmoopsoides
Signetopsis
Sigynus
Silenis Neckaja, 1958
Silenites
Simeonella
Simicypris
Sinocoelonella
Sinocytheridea
Sinoleperditia
Sinoprimitia
Sinusuella
Siveteria
Sleia
Slependia
Snaidar
Soanella
Sollenella
Sondagella
Songlinella
Soudanella
Speluncella
Sphaeroleberis
Sphenicibysis
Sphenocytheridea
Spinaechmina
Spinella
Spinigerites
Spinobairdia
Spinohippula
Spinoleberis
Spinomicrtocheilinella
Spinopleura
Spongicythere
Spytihnevites
Staringia
Steinachella
Steinfurtia
Stenestroemia
Sternbergea
Steusloffia
Steusloffina
Stibus
Stictobollia
Stigmatocythere
Stillina
Stratpbythoceratina
Stravia
Strepula
Strepulites
Striatobythoceratina
Strigocythere
Stroterobolbina
Struveopsis
Subligaculum
Subtella
Subulacypris
Sudon
Sulcatiella
Sulcella
Sulcicuneus
Sulcuna
Sunella
Suriekovella
Susus
Suvalkeilla
Suzinia
Svantovites
Svarogites
Svatojonitella
Svealuta
Swainocythere
Swantina
Swartzochilina
Sylithis
Sylthere
Syltherella
Sylvestra
Tajurina
Tallinnella
Tallinnellina
Tallinnopsis
Tambovia
Tanella
Taracythere
Tatariella
Tavanicythere
Taxodiella
Tchizhovaella
Tegaspis
Tegea
Tegmenia
Teichochilina
Telegraphia
Tenebrion
Tenedocythere
Terquemula
Tetracytherurua
Tetrada
Tetradella
Tetrasacculus
Tetrastorthynx
Tetrasulcata
Tetratylus
Thaerocythere
Thalmannia
Thaumatocypris
Thaumatomma
Theriosynoecum
Therioxynpecum
Thibautina
Thlipsohealdia
Thlipsorothella
Thlipsura
Thlipsurella
Thlipsurina
Thlipsuroides
Thlipsuropsis
Thomasatia
Thrallella
Tianjinia
Tickalacythere
Timiriasevia
Timiskamella
Timorhealdia
Tinotoxotis
Tirisochilina
Tmemolophus
Togoina
Tollita
Tomiella
Tomiellina
Toolongella
Torista
Torusilina
Trachycythere
Trachyleberidea
Trachyleberis
Trapezisylthere
Treposella
Triadocypris
Triadogigantocypris
Trianguloschmidtella
Triassinella
Triassocypris
Triassocythere
Tribolbina
Tribotoxotis
Triceratina
Tricordis
Tricornina
Triebacythere
Triebelina
Triemilomatella
Triginglymus
Trinacriacythere
Trinota
Triplacera
Tropidiana
Tropidotoxotis
Truyolsina
Trypetera
Tscherdynzeviana
Tschigovana
Tschingizella
Tsitrella
Tsunyiella
Tuberculocythere
Tuberoceratina
Tubulibairdia
Tumidella
Tungschuania
Turiella
Turmaekrithe
Tvaerenella
Typhloeucytherura
Uchtovia
Uhakiella
Ullehmannia
Ullerella
Ulrichella
Ulrichia
Undipila
Undulirete
Ungerella
Unicornites
Unisulcopleura
Unodentina
Unzhiella
Uralina
Urdia
Urftella
Urgachilina
Urocythere
Urocythereis
Uroleberis
Uscopria
Ushkarella
Ussuricavina
Uthoerina
Utsatia
Uvonhachtia
Uvonhactia
Vaivanovia
Valdarella
Valentinia Crasquin-Soleau in Crasquin-Soleau & Orchard 1994 (non Walsingham, 1907: preoccupied – see Crasquinia)
Valumoceratina
Varicobairdia
Varilatella
Vattenfallia
Veenia
Veeniacythereis
Veeniceratina
Velapezoides
Velarocythere
Ventrigyrus
Ventrocythereis
Venula
Venzavella
Vernoniella
Verseya
Vesticytherura
Vestrogothia
Vetustocytheridea
Vicinia
Victoria
Villozona
Virgatocypris
Visnyoella
Vitella
Vitissites
Vitjasiella
Vittella
Vltavina
Vogdesella
Voibokalina
Volganella
Volkina
Voronina
Wabiella
Walcottella
Waldoria
Wangiiawania
Warthinia
Waylendella
Webbylla
Wehrlina
Welchella
Wellandia
Welleria
Welleriella
Welleriopsis
Wicherella
Wichmannella
Winchellatia
Wolburgia
Wuchiapingella
Wutingella
Wuxuania
Xenoleveris
Xestoleberis
Xiajiangella
Xiangzhoulina
Xixionopsis
Xylocythere
Xystinotus
Xystista
Yaoyingella
Yaxianella
Yeshanella
Yichangella
Yiduella
Yokopsis
Youngiella
Yukonibolbina
Yulinella
Zaborovia
Zabythocypris
Zagorala
Zanirinella
Zarinia
Zenkopsis
Zenkovaelina
Zepaera
Zhenpingella
Zhijinella
Zhongbaoella
Zigobolboides
Ziva
Zorotoxotis
Zygobeyrichia
Zygobolba
Zygobolboides

See also

 List of prehistoric brittle stars
 List of prehistoric sea cucumbers
 List of crinoid genera

References

 

 List
Ostracods